Sir Hugh Charles Patrick Joseph Fraser  (23 January 1918 – 6 March 1984) was a British Conservative Party politician and first husband of Lady Antonia Fraser.

Youth and military career
Fraser was the second son of the 14th Lord Lovat and a prominent Roman Catholic. He was educated at Ampleforth College and Balliol College, Oxford, where he was President of the Oxford Union. He also attended the Sorbonne.

He was commissioned into the Lovat Scouts in 1936 and served throughout World War II. During the war, Fraser served in GHQ Liaison Regiment. Lieutenant Fraser was promoted to temporary captain on 14 April 1942 and became second in command of ‘C’ Squadron. In November 1944, he was posted to IS9 as an Intelligence Officer.

Fraser was appointed a Member of the Order of the British Empire:"In February, March and April of this year, he was responsible for planning and organising infiltration and evacuation operations in Southern Holland. Throughout, his work with IS 9 (WEA) has been outstanding, and his powers of leadership and sympathetic handling of agents have largely contributed to the success the operational teams have had during the past months."Fraser was awarded the 1940 Belgian Croix de Guerre with palm:"Capt Fraser was dropped by parachute near Somme-Leuze in the Ardennes on 1 Sept 1944 to act as Liaison Officer between HQ SAS Troops and the Commander of Zone the Belgian Armee Secrete, in whose zone SAS parties of the Belgian SAS Regt were then operating. The Armee Secrete in the Ardennes was very short of arms and it was largely as a result of Capt Fraser's efforts that some 2000 arms were dropped to them in the next three weeks. He also organised the supply of local guides and of intelligence to the advancing US forces. From October 1944 until March 1945 Capt Fraser was in charge of an I.S. 9 Field Section in the Canadian Army sector in Holland where he did valuable work in arranging the exfiltration of allied evaders collected by Lt Kirschen (Belgian SAS Regt operation Fabian) in the Velune district."

Political career
Fraser was elected Member of Parliament for Stone in 1945, later Stafford and Stone following constituency boundary changes, from 1950 until 1983 and then Stafford again until his death. He served as an MP continuously from 1945 until 1984 but did not become Father of the House as he was sworn in as an MP on 15 August 1945 while James Callaghan had been sworn in on 2 August 1945 and so he, rather than Fraser, became Father following the 1983 election.

He was Parliamentary Private Secretary to Oliver Lyttelton (1951–54), a junior minister in the War Office (1958–60) and Colonial Office (1960–62), and Secretary of State for Air (1962–64). He was sworn in as a Member of the Privy Council of the United Kingdom in 1962, giving him the right to the prefix "The Right Honourable" for life. He was an unsuccessful candidate in the Conservative Party's 1975 leadership election, gaining 16 votes in the first round challenging incumbent Edward Heath, with the leadership eventually being won by Margaret Thatcher.

Personal life

Fraser married the future author Lady Antonia Pakenham, daughter of the Earl and Countess of Longford, on 25 September 1956. They had six children, Benjamin, Damian, Orlando, Rebecca, Flora and Natasha. In 1975, while she was still married to him, Lady Antonia Fraser met and started living with playwright Harold Pinter, who was also married at the time. The Frasers divorced in 1977; Lady Antonia married Pinter in 1980 when his divorce became final.

Fraser was the intended target of an IRA car bomb on 23 October 1975. The bomb had been fitted to one of Fraser's cars outside his home in Campden Hill Square. A noted cancer researcher, Professor Gordon Hamilton Fairley, was walking past the car when the bomb exploded prematurely, killing him instantly. Fraser's wife, Lady Antonia, and Caroline Kennedy, a guest of the Frasers visiting London to complete a year-long art course at Sotheby's auction house, would have been in the car when the bomb detonated had it not done so prematurely. The reason that Fraser was targeted for assassination remains unknown.

Death
Sir Hugh Fraser remained in parliament until his death from lung cancer in March 1984, aged 66. Bill Cash retained the seat for the Tories at the by-election two months later.

References

Sources
 
 
 
 

 
 

 
 

 
 

1918 births
1984 deaths
Politicians from London
Conservative Party (UK) MPs for English constituencies
Deaths from lung cancer in England
Hugh
British Secretaries of State
Secretaries of State for Air (UK)
British Roman Catholics
University of Paris alumni
Presidents of the Oxford Union
British Army personnel of World War II
People educated at Ampleforth College
Alumni of Balliol College, Oxford
Knights Bachelor
Members of the Privy Council of the United Kingdom
Members of the Order of the British Empire
Tennant family
Younger sons of barons
Presidents of the Oxford University Conservative Association
UK MPs 1945–1950
UK MPs 1950–1951
UK MPs 1951–1955
UK MPs 1955–1959
UK MPs 1959–1964
UK MPs 1964–1966
UK MPs 1966–1970
UK MPs 1970–1974
UK MPs 1974
UK MPs 1974–1979
UK MPs 1979–1983
UK MPs 1983–1987
Military personnel from London
Lovat Scouts officers
Recipients of the Croix de guerre (Belgium)
Members of the Parliament of the United Kingdom for Stafford
Ministers in the Macmillan and Douglas-Home governments, 1957–1964
British expatriates in France